are round, hollow Japanese Shinto bells that contains pellets that sound when agitated. The former is associated with Shinto and shrines while the latter is related to Buddhist temples and ceremonies.  

At Shinto shrines, large  drape over entrances, as it is said that ringing them calls , allowing one to acquire positive power and authority, while repelling evil. Handheld clustered , similar to jingle bells, are used musically at Shinto ceremonies. There are ceremonies, for instance, where female performers dance with  bells such as those with some sort of short blade at their center. The bell's cool tinkles are also considered psychological air-conditioning for the summer since their clear ringing is considered cool and refreshing.

 were traditionally made by metal craft artisans. With the onset of industrialisation, they were made by machines. The ones produced by hand however are still considered of higher quality due to the richer and more melodious sound.

Other references 
 is also a female name in Japan, meaning "bell" or "tin".

See also

References

Shinto religious objects
Bells (percussion)
Japanese metalwork
Japanese words and phrases
Shinto in Japan
Amulets
Talismans
Exorcism in Shinto